The Vitalius buecherli tarantula is part of the Vitalius genus, it was first described by Rogério Bertani in 2001. It is found in São Paulo, Brazil in Juquitiba, in the forest of "Planalto Atlantico", in "Serra da Paranapiacaba". It is named in honor of Wolfgang Bücherl, thanks to his contributions in Brazilian mygalomorphs.

Description 
The carapace is brown, with some light brown bordering, the legs are dark brown. The sternum and abdomen are ventrally grayish, covered with long reddish hairs. Males can be distinguished from all Vitalius species except V. Dubius by the noticeable prolateral superior keel in the palpal bulb, and females by the thin tibiae.

Habitat 
This tarantula can be found in the "Planalto Atlantico" forest, in "Serra da Paranapiacaba", the Atlantic forest is known as a biodiversity hotspot, it is the second largest rainforest in South America. Serra da Paranapiacaba being one of the best preserved forest remains. The vegetation is mountainous forest with a consistent amount of rainfall, with a little semi-deciduous and restinga forest.

References 

Theraphosidae
Spiders described in 2001
Spiders of Brazil